Boris Sádecký (20 April 1997 – 3 November 2021) was a Slovak professional ice hockey player who played professionally for Bratislava Capitals of the bet-at-home ICE Hockey League.

On October 30, 2021, Sádecký inexplicably collapsed on the ice in the final seconds of the first period of a game against the Dornbirn Bulldogs, and died in hospital on November 3. According to his relatives, he suffered a mild heartburn on the day of the collapse. And during hospital examinations it was found that he had an inflammation of the heart which potentially lead to cardiac arrest during the game.

Career statistics

Regular season and playoffs

International

References

External links

 

1997 births
2021 deaths
Slovak ice hockey centres
Sportspeople from Trenčín
HK Dukla Trenčín players
HC Slovan Bratislava players
Bratislava Capitals players
Ice hockey players who died while playing